Spain competed at the 2018 Winter Olympics in Pyeongchang, South Korea, from 9 to 25 February 2018.

On 15 February, Regino Hernández became Spain's first Winter Olympic medalist in 26 years (since the 1992 Winter Olympics) when he won the bronze medal in men's snowboard cross. He became also the first ever Olympic medalist in snowboarding for Spain, all previous Spanish Winter Olympic medals coming from alpine skiing disciplines.

On 17 February, Javier Fernández won Spain's first ever Olympic medal in ice sports when he won the bronze medal in the men's single figure skating competition.

These achievements made this edition Spain's most successful Winter Olympics to date in terms of total medal count. For the first time, both Spanish sport federations in charge of winter sports (Real Federación Española de Deportes de Invierno and Federación Española de Deportes de Hielo) got medals in the same Winter Olympics.

Medalists

Competitors
The following is the list of number of competitors participating at the Games per sport/discipline.

Alpine skiing

Cross-country skiing 

Spain qualified two male athletes.

Distance

Sprint

Figure skating 

Based on placements at the 2017 World Figure Skating Championships in Helsinki, Finland, Spain qualified 4 athletes (3 male and 1 female) in the men's singles and ice dancing events.
One of the men's quotas was directly given to Javier Fernández, the other men's quota and the ice dance quota was decided according to the 2017 CS Golden Spin of Zagreb and the National Championships results.

Skeleton 

Spain qualified one male athlete.

Snowboarding 

Freestyle

Qualification Legend: Q – Qualify to final

Snowboard cross

Qualification legend: Q – Qualify to next round, FA – Qualify to medal round; FB – Qualify to consolation round.

References

Nations at the 2018 Winter Olympics
2018
Winter Olympics